Salvador (not to be confused with El Salvador) is a hamlet in Grass Lake Rural Municipality No. 381, Saskatchewan, Canada. The community had a population of 35 at the 2001 Census. It previously held the status of village until February 1, 1998. The hamlet is located 38 km north-west of the Towns of Luseland & Kerrobert on highway 31 along the Canadian Pacific Railway subdivision.

History
Prior to February 1, 1998, Madison was incorporated as a village, and was restructured as a hamlet under the jurisdiction of the Rural municipality of Grass Lake that date.

See also

St. Joseph's Colony, Saskatchewan
List of communities in Saskatchewan
Hamlets of Saskatchewan

References

Former villages in Saskatchewan
Grass Lake No. 381, Saskatchewan
Unincorporated communities in Saskatchewan
Populated places disestablished in 1998
Division No. 13, Saskatchewan